This is a list of languages used in Russia. Some of the languages have more speakers, and even official status, in other countries.

Official language 

 Russian (138,312,001 speakers)

Languages related to European Russia

Languages with 1,000,000 or more speakers 
 English (7,574,302)
 Tatar (5,200,000)
 German (2,069,949)
 Chuvash (1,640,000)
 Bashkir (1,450,000)
 Chechen (1,340,000)
 Ukrainian (1,300,000)

Languages with 100,000 or more speakers 

 Armenian 
 Avar (784,000)
 Azerbaijani (669,000)
 Mordovian languages (614,000)
 Moksha
 Erzya
 Kabardian (587,000)
 Dargwa (503,000)
 Ossetic (493,000)
 Udmurt (463,000)
 Yakut (450.000)
 Kumyk (458,000)
 Eastern Mari (451,000)
 Ingush (405,000)
 Lezgian (397,000)
 Belarusian (316,000)
 Karachay-Balkar (302,000)
 Georgian (286,000)
 Komi-Zyrian (217,000)
 Turkish (161,000)
 Kalmyk (153,000)
 Lak (153,000)
 Romanian (147,000)
 Adyghe (129,000)
 Tabassaran (128,000)

Languages with 10,000 or more speakers 

 Komi-Permyak (94,000)
 Polish (94,000)
 Nogai (90,000)
 Karelian (52,000)
 Finnish (51,000)
 Lithuanian (49,000)
 Abaza (38,000)
 Western Mari (36,000)
 Latvian (34,000)
 Kurmanji (30,000)
 Yiddish (30,000)
 Rutul (29,000)
 Aghul (29,000)
 Estonian (26,000)
 Andi (23,000)
 Baltic Romany (20,000)
 Tsez (15,000)
 Bezhta (10,000)
 Vlax Romany (10,000)
 Livvi

Languages with 1,000 or more speakers 

 Assyrian Neo-Aramaic (7,700)
 Khwarshi (3,000)
 Serbian
 Veps
 Tindi
 Karata
 Ludian
 Hunzib
 Bagvalal
 Botlikh
 Tsakhur
 Akhvakh
 Ghodoberi
 Archi
 Chamalal
 Judeo-Tat

Languages with fewer than 1,000 speakers 

 Sami languages
 Akkala Sami
 Kildin Sami
 Skolt Sami
 Ter Sami
 Vod
 Ingrian
 Hinukh
 Kurdish

Languages related to Asian Russia

Languages with 100,000 or more speakers 

 Kazakh (563,000)
 Yakut (456,000)
 Buryat (368,000)
 Tuvin (242,000)
 Uzbek (238,000)
 Tajiki (131,000)

Languages with 10,000 or more speakers 

 Altay (65,000)
 Khakas (52,000)
 Kyrgyz (46,000)
 Nenets (31,000)
 Evenki (13,800)
 Khanty (13,000)
 Shor (around 10,000)

Languages with 1,000 or more speakers 

 Even (5,656)
 Mansi (2,746)
 Dolgan (1,054)
 Selkup (1,023)

Languages with fewer than 1,000 speakers 

 Yupik languages
 Naukan (Naukanski)
 Sirenik
 Central Siberian Yupik (Yuit)
 Yukaghir languages
 Northern Yukaghir
 Southern Yukaghir
 Ket
 Ainu
 Orok
 Udege
 Kerek
 Aleut (including Mednyy)
 Enets
 Alutor
 Negidal
 Tofalar (Karagas)
 Itelmen
 Yugh
 Nganasan
 Oroch
 Chulym
 Ulch
 Nivkh
 Nanai

Other 

 Korean (60,000)
 Koryo-mar
 Mandarin Chinese (59,000)
 Turkmen (38,000)
 Czech
 Domari
 Lomavren
 Pontic Greek
 Bohtan Neo-Aramaic
 Tat language
 Russian sign language

Language families
A total of 14 language families are native to Russia:

Indo-European
Caucasian (2 families)
Northeast Caucasian
Northwest Caucasian
Uralic
"Altaic" (3 families)
Turkic
Mongolic
Tungusic
"Paleosiberian" (6 families)
Yeniseian
Chukotko-Kamchatkan
Yukaghir
Nivkh
Ainu
Koreanic
Eskimo–Aleut

References

External links 
 Languages of European Russia (Ethnologue)
 Languages of Asian Russia (Ethnologue)
 Indigenous Minority Languages of Russia: Bibliographical guide

 
Russia